The RPD (English: Degtyaryov hand-held machine gun) is a 7.62x39mm light machine gun developed in the Soviet Union by Vasily Degtyaryov for the 7.62×39mm M43 intermediate cartridge. It was created as a replacement for the DP machine gun chambered for the 7.62×54mmR round. It is a precursor of most squad automatic weapons. It was succeeded in Soviet service by the RPK.

History

Work on the weapon commenced in 1943. Three prominent Soviet engineers were asked to submit their own designs: Vasily Degtyaryov, Sergei Simonov and Alexei Sudayev. Among the completed prototypes prepared for evaluation, the Degtyaryov design proved superior and was accepted into service with the Soviet armed forces as the 7.62 mm Ручной Пулемёт Дегтярёва, PПД (RPD, Ruchnoy Pulemyot Degtyaryova or "Degtyaryov light machine gun") model 1944. 

Although the RPD was ready for mass production during the final stages of World War II, it was adopted in 1948 and large scale delivery of the weapon did not begin until 1953. 

During the Vietnam War, the RPD and its Chinese copy (Type 56) served the Viet Cong and the People's Army of Vietnam as their standard light machine gun.

After the introduction of the Kalashnikov-pattern support weapons, such as the RPK and PK machine guns in the 1960s, the RPD was withdrawn from most first-tier units of the former Warsaw Pact. However, the RPD remains in active service in many African and Asian nations. 

Apart from the former Soviet Union, the weapon was manufactured in China (as the Type 56 LMG), Egypt (Maadi RPD), North Korea (Type 62) and, since 1956, Poland.

Design details

Operating mechanism
The RPD is an automatic weapon using a gas-operated long-stroke piston system and a locking system recycled from previous Degtyaryov small arms, consisting of a pair of hinged flaps set in recesses on each side of the receiver. 

The movement of these flaps and the resulting locking and unlocking action is controlled by carefully angled surfaces on the bolt carrier assembly. The weapon fires from an open bolt.

Features
The RPD is hammer fired from an open bolt. The hammer forms part of the rear of the bolt carrier (which is connected to the gas piston), which continues moving forward for a short distance after the round is chambered and the bolt locked, the hammer face then striking the rear of the free floating firing pin which passes through the length of the bolt. 

Locking occurs by means of lateral flaps located along the sides of the bolt, which are forced outwards (by the angled sides of the hammer) into recesses cut into the receiver body, after which firing occurs when the face of the hammer strikes the rear of the firing pin. The mechanism is simple, rugged and reliable. 

It features a trigger mechanism that is limited to fully automatic fire only. The bolt is equipped with a spring-loaded casing extraction system, and a fixed insert inside the receiver housing which passes between the feed horns of the bolt serves as the ejector. 

Spent cartridge casings are ejected downward through an opening in the bolt carrier and receiver. The RPD has a manually operated lever-type safety mechanism that secures the weapon against accidental firing by blocking the bolt catch when engaged. Unlike Degtyarov's earlier firearm patents, the RPD's return spring is located inside the butt. 

Like many other Russian-made firearms, the chamber and bore are chrome-lined, greatly decreasing the risk of corrosion and jamming. 

The weapon has a non-removable barrel with a three-position gas adjustment valve used to control the performance of the gas system. It is also equipped with a folding integral bipod, wooden shoulder stock, foregrip and pistol grip. The firearm strips down into the following major groups: the receiver and barrel, bolt, bolt carrier, feed tray and feed cover, the recoil mechanism and the trigger group and stock.

Feeding
The RPD fires from an open bolt in full auto only. There is no provision for semi-auto fire, although RPD gunners were trained to fire in short bursts to prolong the life of the non-quick-change barrels. The RPD feeds ammunition from the left side using a metallic, open-link, non-disintegrating belt typically holding 100 rounds of 7.62x39 ammunition. Unlike many other belt-fed automatic weapons, where the rounds must be pulled out the rear of the belt and then pushed forward into the chamber, the RPD uses a simpler "push through" design where the rounds are pushed out the front of the belt and into the chamber. At least three variants of the RPD belt were produced. The Russians and Hungarians both produced 50-round belt segments, while the Chinese produced 25-round belt segments. 

The Russian RPD belts held the rounds in place using the extractor groove. The Hungarians designed a simpler belt that held the cartridges in place using an "L"-shaped tab at the rear of the belt. The Chinese copied the Hungarian design for their belts, albeit in 25-round lengths instead of 50. RPD belt segments are connected using a round of ammunition that holds the last link of the first belt and the first link of the next belt together. When the last round in a belt segment is fired, that belt segment disconnects and falls away, reducing the chances of the empty belt snagging or becoming entangled. Regardless of the style of belt used, the RPD was typically fed using 100 rounds of linked ammunition. 

The Russian, Hungarian, and Chinese RPD belts are all interchangeable, and can be linked together without affecting the feeding of the RPD.

The combined belt segments are stored in a metal drum that is attached to a mount on the receiver, for a total of 100 rounds. The RPD can also feed belts that are not contained in a drum if, for example, there is a need for more than 100 rounds of linked ammunition at a time. The feed system is operated by a roller connected to the reciprocating bolt carrier assembly. The belt is pulled into the gun during the rearward motion of the bolt carrier. The noteworthy flaw in the drum's design is its unreliability in dirty conditions; it can become clogged with filth and other natural elements.

Sights
The RPD is equipped with a set of open-type iron sights. These consist of a front post and a notched rear sight mounted on a tangent. Both the front and rear sights on the RPD are adjustable for windage and elevation. The front sight is adjusted up or down for elevation using a tool included in the issued cleaning kit. To adjust the front sight for windage, the smaller of the two wrenches on the multi-tool included in the issued cleaning kit is used to loosen the retaining bolt on the front sight clamp. The front sight can then be adjusted left or right for the correct windage, after which the retaining bolt is reinstalled to lock the sight into place. The rear sight is adjusted for elevation using a slider. 

The rear sight is marked in 100 meter increments from 100 to 1,000 meters. The rear sight is adjusted for windage using a knob on the left side of the rear sight. Because the front sight of the RPD must be partially disassembled in order to adjust windage, in practice the front sight would have been zeroed for windage and then locked in place. Adjustment for windage in the field would have been accomplished using the knob on the rear sight.

A number of RPDs were fitted with a side rail (attached to the left side of the receiver) to accept an NSP-2 night vision sight.

Accessories
Standard accessories issued with the weapon include and sling, extra ammunition drums and belts (with either belt or shoulder pouches for same), oil bottle, cleaning rod (carried in a slot on the left side of the receiver), (stowed in a compartment inside the stock), and drop case.

The cleaning kit consists of a rectangular metal clam-shell case that typically contains the following tools and spare parts: pin punch (used for disassembling the bolt), cleaning jag, multi-tool (includes screwdriver, small and large wrenches used for adjusting the front sight and gas system, respectively, and a notch for installing and removing the cleaning jag on the cleaning rod), broken case extractor, front sight adjustment tool, gas tube scraping tool, gas port reamer, spare extractor, spare extractor spring, spare firing pin. 

There are a number of spring steel "fingers" on the lid of the clam-shell case which press on the contents of the cleaning kit when closed to prevent rattling. One end of the clam-shell case has a notch from which the screwdriver end of the multi-tool can protrude.

Variants
During its service life, the weapon was modernized several times. Initially, the gas block was modified as was the rear sight, where the windage adjustment knob for the rear sight was moved to the left side of the notch. Later, the RPD was modified with a non-reciprocating cocking mechanism with a folding charging handle (replacing the fixed charging handle connected to the bolt carrier) that does not move during firing. The feed port received a dust cover, which when open, serves as a feeding ramp for the ammunition belt. This version of the light machine gun was produced mainly in China and Poland. 

A further modified variant (sometimes referred to as the RPDM) includes an extended gas cylinder and a recoil buffer mechanism in the stock. Late production RPD variants also had the fixed drum attachment removed (instead, the ammunition container was "hung" from the feed port cover) and feature a folding cleaning rod, that is stored in the weapon's butt (in the Chinese Type 56-1 variant).

DS Arms RPD
American firearm manufacturer DS Arms makes a semi-auto variant for civil market and a full-auto variant for export, both in the original design and also in a modernized version called RPD Carbine. The RPD Carbine has a fluted 17.5-inch barrel, modern front sight, alloy handguard with rails, M249-type pistol grip and M4 recoil spring tube and buttstock.

Civilian variants
Because semi-auto RPD variants are manufactured using de-milled parts kits from full-auto RPD machine guns, in order to comply with ATF regulations the full-auto parts must be modified such that the resulting semi-auto rifle cannot be readily converted into a machine gun. Numerous machining operations are necessary to modify the de-milled full-auto RPD parts for use in a semi-auto RPD receiver. For example, the side rails on the bolt carrier must be machined to fit into the slots of the semi-auto receiver, which are purposefully made too narrow to accept an unmodified full-auto RPD bolt carrier. Additional portions of the bolt carrier that are necessary for full-auto firing, such as the sear engagement surface, must be machined off during the semi-auto conversion process. 

Semi-auto RPD variants must also fire from a closed bolt, which requires the addition of a striker mechanism and other fire control group parts that are not found on full-auto RPD machine guns.

Users

 
 
 
 
 
 
 
 
 : Burundian rebels
 , including Type 56s
 
 
 
 
 
 
 
 
 
 
 
 
 
  Hungary
 
 
 
 
 
 
 
 
 
 
 
 
  Type 62
 
 
 
 
 : used on Land Rovers
 
 
 
 
 
 
 
 
 
 : Modified version issued to MACVSOG, with shortened barrrel and 125 round belt

Former users
 : Type 56 and Type 56-1. Superseded by the Type 81 LMG and QBB-95 LSW in service, formerly produced by Norinco.
  East Germany (former user). Locally designated lMG D or leichtes Maschinengewehr Degtjarjow (lit. light machine gun Degtyaryov).
  (no longer in use) locally designated name 7.62 kk 54 RPD
 : Used by different armed groups in 1990s, out of service.

Non-state users
 People's Movement for the Liberation of Azawad

Wars

Vietnam War
Laotian Civil War
Suez Crisis
Sino-Indian War
Cambodian Civil War
Six-Day War
Indonesian invasion of East Timor
Yom Kippur War
Rhodesian Bush War
South African Border War
Nathu La and Cho La clashes
Bangladesh Liberation War
Western Sahara War
Lebanese Civil War
Shaba II
Cambodian–Vietnamese War
Sino-Vietnamese War
Soviet–Afghan War
Salvadoran Civil War
Somali Civil War
Tuareg rebellion (1990–1995)
Iran-Iraq War
Gulf War
Yugoslav Wars
Rwandan Civil War
Burundian Civil War
Congo Civil War
War in Afghanistan
Iraq War
Ivorian Civil Wars
Thai–Laotian Border War
War in North-West Pakistan
Cambodian–Thai border stand-off
Libyan Civil War
Syrian Civil War
Yemeni Civil War (2015–present)
Saudi Arabian-led intervention in Yemen

See also
 Degtyarev-Garanin KB-P 790
 FN Minimi
 IWI Negev
 HK MG4
 PKP Pecheneg machine gun
 RPL-20
 Daewoo Precision Industries K3
 Ultimax 100
 IP-2
 List of modern Russian small arms and light weapons

Notes

References

External links

 Soviet RPD Manual Covering Operation and Repair
 Modern Firearms

7.62×39mm machine guns
Infantry weapons of the Cold War
Cold War firearms of the Soviet Union
World War II infantry weapons of the Soviet Union
Light machine guns
Machine guns of the Soviet Union
Weapons and ammunition introduced in 1944